Mashed potato is a common way of serving potato, made by mashing boiled potatoes.

Mashed potato or mashed potatoes may also refer to:
 Mashed Potato (dance), a dance move that was popular during the early 1960s
 "(Do the) Mashed Potatoes", a 1960 single by Nat Kendrick and the Swans featuring James Brown
 Mashed Potatoes (album), a 1962 album by Steve Alaimo
 Instant mashed potatoes, a convenience food
 Alu Bharta (roughly translated to "mashed potatoes"), a Bengali dish

See also

 "Mashed Potatoes U.S.A.", a 1962 single by James Brown
 "Mashed Potato Time", a 1962 song by Dee Dee Sharp 
 
 
 
 
 Mashed (disambiguation)
 Potato (disambiguation)